Marilyn Miller (1898–1936) was an American Broadway musical actress.

Marilyn Miller may also refer to:
 Marilyn Suzanne Miller (born 1950), American television writer and producer
 Marilyn T. Miller, American pediatric ophthalmologist
 Marilyn L. Miller (1930–2014), American librarian and educator

See also
 Marilyn Monroe (1926–1962), American actress, model, and singer, married to Arthur Miller